Lawal is a surname. People with the name include:

Abass Lawal, Nigerian footballer
Adeshina Lawal, Nigerian footballer
Amina Lawal, Nigerian woman sentenced to death
Gani Lawal, United States basketball player
Garba Lawal, Nigerian footballer
Luke Lawal Jr., American entrepreneur
Hassan Muhammed Lawal, Nigerian politician
Mudashiru Lawal, Nigerian footballer
Muhammed Lawal, American Mixed Martial Artist and former collegiate wrestler